Naomi Belhassen (born 6 April 1980) is a former Israeli football player who played as a defender for ASA Tel Aviv University and Israel.

Honours
 Ligat Nashim (7): 1999–2000, 2009–10, 2010–11, 2011–12, 2012–13, 2013–14, 2014–15
 Israeli Women's Cup (3): 2010–11, 2011–12, 2013–14

References

External links 
 

1980 births
Living people
Israeli women's footballers
Israel women's international footballers
ASA Tel Aviv University players
Women's association football defenders